= Kajgana.com =

Macedonian language web portal

- Website type: Web portal
- Available in: Macedonian
- Creators: Darko Lazarevski; Marjan Lazarevski; Dejan Petkovski; Darko Stoilevski
- Website: http://www.kajgana.com/
- Commercial: Yes
- Registration: Optional
- Launched: January 2005
- Current status: Active

Kajgana.com is an independent Macedonian language web portal launched in January 2005. With over 1,000,000 unique visitors per month, it is currently the most visited Macedonian web portal.

Kajgana.com also hosts the most popular Macedonian internet forum, an online advertiser, an internet radio, and game servers, and is the home of many Macedonian internet memes.

== Management ==
- Darko Lazarevski (co-founder and Editor-in-chief)
- Marjan Lazarevski (co-founder and Co-editor)
- Dejan Petkovski (co-founder and CMO)
- Darko Stoilevski (co-founder and CTO)
- Vladislav Bidikov (web master)
